The Đại Việt sử ký (Annals of Đại Việt) is the official historical text of the Trần dynasty, that was compiled by the royal historian Lê Văn Hưu and was finished in 1272. Considered the first comprehensive account of the history of Vietnam, the 30-volume book covered the period from Triệu Đà, the first king of the Triệu dynasty, to Lý Chiêu Hoàng which was the empress regnant and the last ruler of the Lý dynasty. Although it was lost during the Fourth Chinese domination in Vietnam, the contents of the Đại Việt sử ký, including Lê Văn Hưu's comments about various events in the history of Vietnam, were used by other Vietnamese historians as a base for their works, notably the Đại Việt sử ký toàn thư by Ngô Sĩ Liên.

History of compilation 
Lê Văn Hưu was a renowned scholar and an official of the royal court of the Trần dynasty during the reign of Trần Thái Tông and Trần Thánh Tông who promoted him to the position of Hàn Lâm viện học sĩ (Member of the Hanlin Academy) and Quốc sử viện giám tu (Supervisor of the royal bureau for historical records). It was the Emperor Thái Tông who commissioned Lê Văn Hưu to compile the official historical text of the Trần dynasty named Đại Việt sử ký. The 30-volume (quyển) text was completed and offered to the Emperor Trần Thánh Tông in January 1272 and was praised by Thánh Tông for its quality. Lê Tắc in his An Nam chí lược suggested that the Đại Việt sử ký was compiled by Lê Văn Hưu in revising the book Việt chí (越志, Records of Việt) which was written by Trần Phổ after the order of Trần Thái Tông.

During the Fourth Chinese domination, many valuable books of Đại Việt were taken away by the Ming dynasty including the Đại Việt sử ký, hence the book was subsequently lost. However, the contents of the Đại Việt sử ký and Lê Văn Hưu's comments about various historical events was collected by the historian Phan Phu Tiên, who used them to write the first official annals of the Lê dynasty at the order of the Emperor Lê Nhân Tông in 1455. The new Đại Việt sử ký of Phan Phu Tiên  supplemented the period from 1223 with the coronation of Trần Thái Tông to 1427 and with the retreat of the Ming dynasty after the victory of Lê Lợi. Phan Phu Tiên's 10-volume work had other names such as Đại Việt sử ký tục biên (Supplementary Edition of the Annals of Đại Việt) or Quốc sử biên lục. Afterwards, the historian Ngô Sĩ Liên based on the works of Lê Văn Hưu and Phan Phu Tiên to write his essential book the Đại Việt sử ký toàn thư which was compiled in 6 volumes and finished in 1479.

Việt sử lược (Brief History of Việt), the surviving book of Vietnam during the occupation of the Ming dynasty is also considered a condensed version of the Đại Việt sử ký.

Contents 

Since the original version of the Đại Việt sử ký was absorbed in the works of Phan Phu Tiên and Ngô Sĩ Liên, it is difficult to distinguish which part was written by Lê Văn Hưu and which ones were compiled by the others. They only know that Lê Văn Hưu chose the foundation of the Kingdom of Nam Việt in 207 BC by Triệu Đà as the starting point for the history of Vietnam and finished his work with the reign of Lý Chiêu Hoàng from 1224 to 1225. The only original contents of the Đại Việt sử ký which still remained in other books were Lê Văn Hưu's 30 comments on various events in history of Vietnam:

Historical perspectives 

Considered the first comprehensive historical record of the history of Vietnam, Đại Việt sử ký was compiled by Lê Văn Hưu in following the format of Sima Guang's Zizhi Tongjian (Comprehensive Mirror to Aid in Government). During the period of compilation, Lê Văn Hưu had chance to witness one of the principal events of the Trần dynasty which was the war of resistance of Đại Việt against the second and third Mongol invasions. With the continuous threat from the northern border, Thái Tông and Thánh Tông commissioned Lê Văn Hưu to write the historical text so that the Trần clan could learn experiences from Đại Việt's past to enforce its ruling and affirm the independence of the country from China.

These purposes of the emperors and Lê Văn Hưu explained why the historian chose the foundation of the Kingdom of Nam Việt in 207 BC by Triệu Đà as the starting point for the history of Vietnam, an opinion which was challenged by several Vietnamese historians from Ngô Thì Sĩ in eighteenth century to modern historians because the kings of Nam Việt were of Chinese origin. Based on the independence of Nam Việt from the Han dynasty, Lê Văn Hưu considered its founder Triệu Đà the first and fine example of a Vietnamese ruler caring for the independence of the country. Another example for Lê Văn Hưu's interest in the theme of Vietnam's equality with China was his remark on the enthronement in 968 of Đinh Tiên Hoàng who was considered by Lê Văn Hưu the successor of Triệu Đà in reclaiming the identity of Vietnam while actually it was Ngô Quyền who marked the end of the northern domination in Vietnam in 938 with his victory in the Battle of Bạch Đằng. According to the historian, it was Đinh Tiên Hoàng and not Ngô Quyền who had the major contribution in re-establishing the independent status of the country from China because Ngô Quyền was content only with the position of King (Vương) while Đinh Tiền Hoàng took a further step in designating himself as the emperor (Hoàng đế) of the country and was thus equal to the emperor of the Song dynasty.

Since Lê Văn Hưu highly treasured the independence of Vietnam, he often had negative comments on historical figures who was considered by Lê Văn Hưu being more or less responsible for the loss of the country's autonomy to its northern neighbour such as the chancellor Lữ Gia of Nam Việt or Lý Nam Đế. While the contemporary opinion praised Lý Nam Đế as a national hero of Vietnam for his revolt against the Liang dynasty, Lê Văn Hưu criticized Lý Nam Đế's ability because he was ultimately defeated and hence Vietnam lost its independence one more time. However, Lê Văn Hưu saved his best praise for the Trưng Sisters who led the resistance movement against the Han dynasty and were finally put down by the army of Ma Yuan in 42. In Lê Văn Hưu's words, the men of Vietnam had to feel ashamed of their surrender to the northerners while the Trưng Sisters, who were women, fiercely fought for the country. About Chinese rulers of Vietnam, Lê Văn Hưu gave favorable remarks for ones who contributed to the stability of the country, the historian respectfully called the prefect Sĩ Nhiếp as Sĩ Vương (King Sĩ) who kept the autonomous status of Vietnam from the direct administration of the Eastern Wu for a long period.

Beside the concern for the identity of the country, Lê Văn Hưu also paid special importance to the ability in reigning the country of Vietnamese rulers from Ngô Quyền to Lý Anh Tông with his comments from a Confucianist standpoint. He criticized Lý Thái Tổ for having built many Buddhist pagodas instead of saving those resources for the country and his people. The coronation of Sùng Hiền hầu as Retired Emperor of the Lý dynasty in 1129 by Lý Thần Tông was given a negative remark by Lê Văn Hưu for the lack of Confucianist hierarchy in the royal family because Thần Tông should have given the title to his predecessor Lý Nhân Tông instead of his biological father. However, Lê Văn Hưu's emphasis of Confucianism was much less than Ngô Sĩ Liên in his Đại Việt sử ký toàn thư which was an historical text almost purely based on a Confucianist point of view because the main interest of Lê Văn Hưu was always Vietnam's independence from and equality with its northern neighbour China. Therefore, Lê Văn Hưu's Đại Việt sử ký was considered an essential work in affirming an autonomous identity for Vietnam.

References

Notes

Bibliography 
 
 
 
 
 
 

Trần dynasty texts
1272 books
History books about Vietnam
Chinese-language literature of Vietnam